Konstantinovka is the name of several rural localities in Russia.

Altai Krai
As of 2010, one rural locality in Altai Krai bears this name:
Konstantinovka, Altai Krai, a selo in Konstantinovsky Selsoviet of Kulundinsky District

Amur Oblast
As of 2010, one rural locality in Amur Oblast bears this name:
Konstantinovka, Amur Oblast, a selo in Konstantinovsky Rural Settlement of Konstantinovsky District

Republic of Bashkortostan
As of 2010, two rural localities in the Republic of Bashkortostan bear this name:
Konstantinovka, Karmaskalinsky District, Republic of Bashkortostan, a village in Nikolayevsky Selsoviet of Karmaskalinsky District
Konstantinovka, Tuymazinsky District, Republic of Bashkortostan, a selo in Nikolayevsky Selsoviet of Tuymazinsky District

Irkutsk Oblast
As of 2010, one rural locality in Irkutsk Oblast bears this name:
Konstantinovka, Irkutsk Oblast, a village in Zhigalovsky District

Kaliningrad Oblast
As of 2010, two rural localities in Kaliningrad Oblast bear this name:
Konstantinovka, Guryevsky District, Kaliningrad Oblast, a settlement in Dobrinsky Rural Okrug of Guryevsky District
Konstantinovka, Ozyorsky District, Kaliningrad Oblast, a settlement in Krasnoyarsky Rural Okrug of Ozyorsky District

Kaluga Oblast
As of 2010, one rural locality in Kaluga Oblast bears this name:
Konstantinovka, Kaluga Oblast, a village in Peremyshlsky District

Kemerovo Oblast
As of 2010, one rural locality in Kemerovo Oblast bears this name:
Konstantinovka, Kemerovo Oblast, a village in Pervomayskaya Rural Territory of Mariinsky District

Khabarovsk Krai
As of 2010, two rural localities in Khabarovsk Krai bear this name:
Konstantinovka, Khabarovsky District, Khabarovsk Krai, a selo in Khabarovsky District
Konstantinovka, Nikolayevsky District, Khabarovsk Krai, a selo in Nikolayevsky District

Kirov Oblast
As of 2010, one rural locality in Kirov Oblast bears this name:
Konstantinovka, Kirov Oblast, a selo in Konstantinovsky Rural Okrug of Malmyzhsky District

Komi Republic
As of 2010, one rural locality in the Komi Republic bears this name:
Konstantinovka, Komi Republic, a village in Izhma Selo Administrative Territory of Izhemsky District

Kursk Oblast
As of 2010, two rural localities in Kursk Oblast bear this name:
Konstantinovka, Medvensky District, Kursk Oblast, a village in Vysoksky Selsoviet of Medvensky District
Konstantinovka, Sovetsky District, Kursk Oblast, a village in Sovetsky Selsoviet of Sovetsky District

Republic of Mordovia
As of 2010, one rural locality in the Republic of Mordovia bears this name:
Konstantinovka, Republic of Mordovia, a selo in Konstantinovsky Selsoviet of Romodanovsky District

Nizhny Novgorod Oblast
As of 2010, two rural localities in Nizhny Novgorod Oblast bear this name:
Konstantinovka, Knyagininsky District, Nizhny Novgorod Oblast, a village in Vozrozhdensky Selsoviet of Knyagininsky District
Konstantinovka, Pochinkovsky District, Nizhny Novgorod Oblast, a selo in Naruksovsky Selsoviet of Pochinkovsky District

Novosibirsk Oblast
As of 2010, two rural localities in Novosibirsk Oblast bear this name:
Konstantinovka, Kuybyshevsky District, Novosibirsk Oblast, a village in Kuybyshevsky District
Konstantinovka, Tatarsky District, Novosibirsk Oblast, a selo in Tatarsky District

Omsk Oblast
As of 2010, one rural locality in Omsk Oblast bears this name:
Konstantinovka, Omsk Oblast, a village in Utinsky Rural Okrug of Nazyvayevsky District

Orenburg Oblast
As of 2010, one rural locality in Orenburg Oblast bears this name:
Konstantinovka, Orenburg Oblast, a selo in Konstantinovsky Selsoviet of Sharlyksky District

Oryol Oblast
As of 2010, two rural localities in Oryol Oblast bear this name:
Konstantinovka, Mtsensky District, Oryol Oblast, a village in Voinsky Selsoviet of Mtsensky District
Konstantinovka, Sverdlovsky District, Oryol Oblast, a village in Kotovsky Selsoviet of Sverdlovsky District

Penza Oblast
As of 2010, two rural localities in Penza Oblast bear this name:
Konstantinovka, Penzensky District, Penza Oblast, a selo in Salovsky Selsoviet of Penzensky District
Konstantinovka, Serdobsky District, Penza Oblast, a village in Dolgorukovsky Selsoviet of Serdobsky District

Perm Krai
As of 2010, two rural localities in Perm Krai bear this name:
Konstantinovka, Dobryanka, Perm Krai, a village under the administrative jurisdiction of the city of krai significance of Dobryanka
Konstantinovka, Bardymsky District, Perm Krai, a selo in Bardymsky District

Primorsky Krai
As of 2010, two rural localities in Primorsky Krai bear this name:
Konstantinovka, Oktyabrsky District, Primorsky Krai, a selo in Oktyabrsky District
Konstantinovka, Spassky District, Primorsky Krai, a selo in Spassky District

Ryazan Oblast
As of 2010, four rural localities in Ryazan Oblast bear this name:
Konstantinovka, Korablinsky District, Ryazan Oblast, a village in Nikolayevsky Rural Okrug of Korablinsky District
Konstantinovka, Alexandro-Nevsky District, Ryazan Oblast, a village in Leninsky Rural Okrug of Alexandro-Nevsky District
Konstantinovka, Sarayevsky District, Ryazan Oblast, a village in Alexeyevsky Rural Okrug of Sarayevsky District
Konstantinovka, Shilovsky District, Ryazan Oblast, a village in Borovsky Rural Okrug of Shilovsky District

Samara Oblast
As of 2010, two rural localities in Samara Oblast bear this name:
Konstantinovka, Bolsheglushitsky District, Samara Oblast, a selo in Bolsheglushitsky District
Konstantinovka, Yelkhovsky District, Samara Oblast, a village in Yelkhovsky District

Saratov Oblast
As of 2010, three rural localities in Saratov Oblast bear this name:
Konstantinovka, Krasnokutsky District, Saratov Oblast, a selo in Krasnokutsky District
Konstantinovka, Saratovsky District, Saratov Oblast, a selo in Saratovsky District
Konstantinovka, Tatishchevsky District, Saratov Oblast, a village in Tatishchevsky District

Tambov Oblast
As of 2010, one rural locality in Tambov Oblast bears this name:
Konstantinovka, Tambov Oblast, a village in Bolshesheremetyevsky Selsoviet of Pichayevsky District

Republic of Tatarstan
As of 2010, two rural localities in the Republic of Tatarstan bear this name:
Konstantinovka, Aznakayevsky District, Republic of Tatarstan, a village in Aznakayevsky District
Konstantinovka, Vysokogorsky District, Republic of Tatarstan, a selo in Vysokogorsky District